The Tweede Klasse is a women's soccer league in the Netherlands. Teams in this league promote to the Eerste Klasse and relegate to Derde Klasse.

The league is organized in a Saturday and a Sunday division. Each of these are further divided into 4 groups, creating 8 sections.

Sections
Saturday
 Group A: West 1
 Group B: West 2
 Group C: East 1
 Group D: East 2

Sunday
 Group E: West
 Group F: South 1
 Group G: South 2
 Group H: South 1

References

Women's football leagues in the Netherlands